Kuzino is a rural locality (a village) in Bolshesosnovskoye Rural Settlement, Bolshesosnovsky District, Perm Krai, Russia. The population was 119 as of 2010. There are 4 streets.

Geography 
Kuzino is located 15 km southwest of Bolshaya Sosnova (the district's administrative centre) by road. Gladky Mys is the nearest rural locality.

References 

Rural localities in Bolshesosnovsky District